This is a list of members of the Australian Senate between July 2014 and May 2016. Half of the state senators had been elected at the August 2010 election and had terms due to finish on 30 June 2017; the other half of the state senators were elected at the September 2013 election and had terms due to finish on 30 June 2020. The territory senators were elected at the September 2013 election and their terms ended at the dissolution of the House of Representatives, which was May 2016. The new Senate first met in July 2014, with state senators elected in 2013 sworn in on 7 July 2014. Ascertaining the chamber's final composition was complicated by the loss of 1,375 ballot papers in Western Australia, leading to the Court of Disputed Returns voiding the result there, and necessitating a special Senate election in Western Australia (held on 5 April 2014).

All senators' terms were truncated when the double dissolution deadlock provisions were triggered in 2016, leading to the dissolution of all of both houses of parliament on 9 May 2016 which led to a full-senate election, rather than a more common half-senate election, at the 2 July 2016 general election.

Notes

References

Members of Australian parliaments by term
21st-century Australian politicians
Australian Senate lists
2010s politics-related lists